Severo may refer to:

People
Given name

 Severo Antonelli
 Severo Bonini
 Severo Calzetta da Ravenna
 Severo Colberg Ramírez
 Severo Fernández
 Severo Meza
 Severo Moto Nsá
 Severo Ochoa
 Severo Ornstein
 Severo Sarduy
Surname
 Alessandro Severo
 Marieta Severo
 Roberto Severo

In places:
 Severo-Baykalsky District
 Severo-Kurilsk
 Severo-Zapadny (disambiguation), several places

In other uses:
 Augusto Severo International Airport
 Severo-Evensk Airport
 Severo-Eniseysk Airport

See also
 San Severo (disambiguation)

Italian masculine given names
Spanish masculine given names
Severo Ballesteros golf